This list is based upon notable clothing and footwear companies that originated in Portland, Oregon.

Current

 Columbia Sportswear
 Grenade Gloves
 Keen (shoe company)
 LaCrosse Footwear
 Nau (clothing retailer)
 Nike, Inc.
 Pendleton Woolen Mills
 Sock It To Me (clothing company)
 Hanna Andersson
 Bridge & Burn

Former
 Lucy Activewear
 Holden Outerwear

Portland, Oregon-related lists
Companies based in Portland, Oregon
clothing companies